Rachel was launched in the Parish of Terrebonne, Quebec, in 1811. She was condemned in 1813 as irreparably damaged.

Overview
She first appeared in Lloyd's Register (LR) in 1812. 

On 6 August 1812, Rachel. Morin. master, arrived at Liverpool from Quebec. This was at least her second voyage between England and Quebec. On 20 September she sailed from Loch Ryan for Quebec.

Loss 
On 24 January 1813 Rachel, Morin, master, was sailing from Newfoundland to Barbados when she encountered a gale at  that dismasted her and reduced her to a complete wreck. The prevailing winds were from South to West so the crew made for the Western Islands. They arrived on 11 February at Augra on Terceira Island. There it proved impossible to find the stores required to refit her so she was condemned. The entry for her in the 1814 Lloyd's Register carried the annotation "condemned".

Citations 

1811 ships
Ships built in Quebec
Age of Sail merchant ships of England
Maritime incidents in 1813